Haji Husein Alireza & Co. Ltd. (HHA) is a Saudi-based conglomerate. It was established as a general trading company in 1906 with diverse interests including automobiles, foodstuffs, building materials, and jewelry. It is Saudi Arabia's second oldest company.

History

Formed in 1906 as an offshoot of the House of Alireza & Abulhassan.

Haji Husein Alireza & Co. acquired NATCOM, a Saudi IT and hardware company established in 1978.

Haji Hussein Alireza & Company, is consistently ranked among the top 100 companies in Saudi Arabia.

Automobiles

Although HHA's business has been relatively diversified throughout the years, the automotive field remained the main area of the company's activities. In 1926, HHA became the first company to import and distribute automobiles on a commercial basis in the Arabian Peninsula.

The Haji Hussein Alireza & Company is one of the largest distributors of automobiles in Saudi Arabia. The company is the exclusive distributor of Aston Martin, Mazda and MAN Commercial Vehicles in Saudi Arabia. In 2011, the company gained distribution rights for Geely and Peugeot in Saudi Arabia.

Since 1968, HHA has represented Mazda in Saudi Arabia, and became its exclusive distributor. In the first 10 months of 1978, out of the 212,000 vehicles that were imported in Saudi Arabia, HHA accounted of importing 35,000 vehicles (%90 of which was the four-door sedan Mazda 929). In the same year, HHA was selling an average of 3,500 cars a month.

In 2011 the company signed a deal with Geely to import and distribute Geely cars in Saudi Arabia. In 2016 became the exclusive distributor in the kingdom.

Peugeot and HHA ended their partnership as of January 2018.

See also
House of Alireza

References

External links 

Haji Hussein Alireza & Company

Conglomerate companies of Saudi Arabia
Companies based in Jeddah
Conglomerate companies established in 1906
1906 establishments in Saudi Arabia